The Tarkhankut Peninsula is the peninsula which constitutes the western extremity of Crimea into the Black Sea. Its northern shore is a southern coast of the Karkinit Bay. Its westernmost point is Cape Priboyny, to the south of it is Cape Tarkhankut. The terrain of the peninsula is the Tarkhankut Highlands.

Cape Tarkhankut 
Cape Tarkhankut is a south-western cape of the Tarkhankut Peninsula, Crimea. The Tarkhankut lighthouse is located on the cape.

Tarkhankut Upland 
The Tarkhankut Upland or Tarkhankut Hills is an upland that constitutes the Tarkhankut Peninsula. The Tarkhankut Wind Farm is located at the upland.

Wind Farm 
The Tarkhankut Wind Farm (Tarkhankut Wind Plant) is a wind power plant located at Donuzlav lake on the Tarkhankut Highlands of the Tarkhankut Peninsula, Crimea.

It is the state property. Its construction was contracted to Windenergo Ltd., At the commissioning date of November 30, 2001, 21 wind turbines were installed with total capacity of 2.26 MW. The planned capacity was 70 MW.

Donuzlav 
The Donuzlav Lake is a salty lake that is connected to the Black Sea via a ship channel and located at the southern shores of the peninsula.

References

Landforms of Crimea
Peninsulas of Ukraine